The Man from Yesterday is a 1932 American pre-Code romantic war drama film made by Paramount Pictures, directed by Berthold Viertel, and written by Oliver H. P. Garrett, based on a story by Neil Blackwell and Rowland G. Edwards.

Plot

In Paris at the end of the First World War, Sylvia Suffolk and British Expeditionary Force officer Tony Clyde get married, shortly before Tony leaves for the Western Front. Sylvia, newly pregnant, is given the news that Tony was killed in a poison gas attack while working as a nurse for surgeon René Gaudin. Sylvia gradually falls in love with René but is reluctant to remarry since she has no official news of Tony's death. On holiday in Switzerland with René, Sylvia is shocked to find Tony is still alive and convalescing, having been taken prisoner of war with lung damage. Sylva now finds herself torn between duty to Tony and marriage to René. She ultimately decides to stay with Tony and takes him to Paris to see their son, but he realizes that she is still in love with Rene and kills himself.

Cast
Claudette Colbert as Sylvia Suffolk
Clive Brook as Capt. Tony Clyde
Charles Boyer as Rene Gaudin
Andy Devine as Steve Hand
Alan Mowbray as Dr. Waite
Greta Meyer as inn proprietress
Barbara Leonard as Steve's girl
Yola d'Avril as Tony's girl
Emile Chautard as priest
George Davis as taxi driver
Christian Rub as terrace waiter

References

External links
 
 
 
The Man from Yesterday details, themave.com

1932 romantic drama films
1932 films
American black-and-white films
American romantic drama films
Films directed by Berthold Viertel
Western Front (World War I) films
Films about chemical war and weapons
Films set in Switzerland
Films about the British Army
American World War I films
Films set in Paris
1930s American films